Katie Elizabeth Walder (born October 13, 1982) is an American actress.

Career
Walder is best known for her recurring roles on Gilmore Girls as Janet Billings, How I Met Your Mother as Shannon, and Mad Men as Sherry. She has appeared in over 40 television shows, including New Girl, Franklin & Bash, Fairly Legal, The Good Wife, Supernatural, and Rules of Engagement. In 2007, she played Trevor Wright's girlfriend in the award-winning independent film Shelter. In 2014, she starred in the horror film Come Back to Me. 
Walder got her start in New York City, performing in stage roles with Broadway directors including Michael Greif, Keith Reddin, and Daniel Aukin. She will soon be seen in the Paramount-owned comedy short Billy Glimmer opposite Ben Stiller.

Filmography

Film

Television

References

External links
 

American television actresses
Living people
American film actresses
Actresses from Philadelphia
21st-century American actresses
1982 births